HNLMS Piet Hein may refer to following ships of the Royal Netherlands Navy:

 , an 
 , an 
 The ex-, transferred to the Royal Netherlands Navy and renamed Piet Hein

Royal Netherlands Navy ship names